The Szécsényi was a noble family of the Kingdom of Hungary in the 14-15th centuries. The ancestor of the family, Thomas descended from the gens ("clan") Kacsics. He was one of the most powerful barons of King Charles I of Hungary and he hold several dignities during his reign. The family was named after its possession, Szécsény. The male line of the family ended in 1460.

Family tree

Notable members of the family 

 Thomas Szécsényi (cca. 1285-1354), the son of Farkas Szécsényi, joined King Charles I against the powerful Máté Csák III in 1301. In 1342, he was appointed to the office of Master of the King's Treasury (tárnokmester) and in 1349, he became judge royal (országbíró).

Sources
 Markó, László: A magyar állam főméltóságai Szent Istvántól napjainkig - Életrajzi Lexikon (The High Officers of the Hungarian State from Saint Stephen to the Present Days - A Biographical Encyclopedia); Magyar Könyvklub, 2000, Budapest; .
 Engel, Pál: Magyarország világi archontológiája (1301–1457) (The Temporal Archontology of Hungary (1301-1457)); História - MTA Történettudományi Intézete, 1996, Budapest; .

External links 
 

 
Hungarian nobility